Tiny Toon Adventures: Buster Busts Loose! (released in Japan as Tiny Toon Adventures) is a video game for the Super NES console that is based on the animated TV series Tiny Toon Adventures. It was developed and published by Konami, released in 1992 in Japan and in 1993 in Europe and North America.

Gameplay
This game features Buster Bunny in a side-scrolling adventure. It has three difficulty level settings: easy, normal, and hard (in game they are known as "Children", "Normal" and "Challenge" modes respectively) (except the Japanese version which only has easy and normal). Levels are significantly smaller in easy mode, and Buster only has one health container in hard mode, although extra containers can be collected by exploring the levels. The number of containers are reset after each level. This is done to add more of a challenge in this mode.

There are a total of six levels in the game when played normally (the fifth level is removed in easy mode). Buster's objectives vary from level to level, ranging from feeding Dizzy Devil so he stops destroying the school kitchen to defeating "Duck Vader". As is common for the era, the full ending is only accessed by finishing the game on hard (or normal in the Japanese release). After completing each level, the player is given a chance to earn extra lives by playing a minigame, the type of which is determined by spinning a wheel based on the one seen in the episode, "The Wheel O'Comedy".

Reception

IGN ranked the game 99th in their "Top 100 SNES Games of All Time" praising the game as a "impressively varied hop-and-bop platformer". In 2018, Complex placed the game 92nd on their "The Best Super Nintendo Games of All Time" describing the game as " Sheer platforming bliss". Nintendo Power rated the game the tenth best SNES game of 1993. In 1995, Total! listed the game 96th on its "Top 100 SNES Games."

References

External links

1992 video games
1993 video games
Konami games
Platform games
Side-scrolling video games
Single-player video games
Super Nintendo Entertainment System games
Super Nintendo Entertainment System-only games
Video games based on Tiny Toon Adventures
Video games developed in Japan